The Act Governing Relations between the People of the Taiwan Area and the Mainland Area, also called Cross-Strait Act, is the law of the Republic of China (Taiwan or ROC) governing cross-Strait relations.

The main purpose of the act is to protect the security and welfare of the people of Taiwan. The act defines its de facto controlled territory as the Taiwan area. It also provides a legal framework on the relations between Taiwan and mainland China without recognising the People's Republic of China (PRC) and its governmental organisations. It is enacted in accordance with Article 11 of the Additional Articles of the Constitution of the Republic of China promulgated on 1 May 1991.

History
The act was drafted in the late 1980s and early 1990s. Early on 10 May 1948, the National Assembly of the Republic of China adopted the Temporary Provisions against the Communist Rebellion in the midst of the civil war between the Chinese Communist Party and the Kuomintang. In 1949, the Communists overthrew the Nationalist Government from mainland China, and proclaimed the establishment of the People's Republic of China while the government retreated to Taiwan, formerly a Qing province ceded to the Empire of Japan from 1895 to 1945.

During the "Communist Rebellion" period, the ROC regarded cross-Strait relation as at war. However, after the PRC implemented economic reform and altered the approach to Taiwan starting from 1980s, the ROC Government allowed nationals to visit their mainland relatives in 1987, and the necessity of regulating the cross-Strait relationship arose thereafter.

In 1989, the Ministry of Justice unveiled the Provisional Bill Governing Relations between the People of the Taiwan Area and Mainland Area. In 1991, the Temporary Provisions were repealed by President Lee Teng-hui, which allowed the act to be passed by the Legislative Yuan on 16 July 1992 and commenced at the end of the month.

Imposition

Amendments and constitutional validity 
The act is prominent in governing the relationship between Taiwan and Mainland China, which various subsidiary legislations were made under this law, and was amended during the ruling of both Kuomintang and Democratic Progressive Party (DPP).

Article 18 of the act, regarding the deportation of mainlanders that legally entered Taiwan, was ruled unconstitutional in 2013. An amendment was passed in 2019 which any cross-Strait political settlement must be considered by the parliament twice and approved in referendum before being signed by the president. A year later, parliamentarians from DPP tabled amendments to repeal wordings of "before national unification" and substitute with "accordingly to national development" or "during which the governance is limited to Tai-Peng-Kin-Ma and affiliated islands", but was withdrawn days later after first reading.

Applicability on Hong Kong 
According to the act, "people of the Taiwan area" refers to those under the jurisdiction of the government of the Republic of China on Taiwan and its associated islands; "people of the Mainland area" refers to those under the jurisdiction of the government of the People's Republic of China, with the exception of Hong Kong (a former British colony that was ceded by the Qing in 1842) and Macau (formerly a Portuguese colony ceded by the Qing in 1887) which are governed by the separate Laws and Regulations Regarding Hong Kong & Macao Affairs, unless changes in Hong Kong and Macau endanger Taiwan's security as stipulated by Article 60 of the Laws and Regulations:[...] should any change occur in the situation of Hong Kong or Macau such that the implementation of this Act endangers the security of the Taiwan Area, the Executive Yuan may request the President to order suspension of the application of all or part of the provisions of this Act [...]

Should the application of any part of this Act be suspended and no other laws or regulations be formulated to govern relations between the Taiwan Area and Hong Kong or Macau, the relevant provisions of the Act Governing the Relations Between People of the Taiwan Area and the Mainland Area shall apply.

Ban on Red Chinese online platforms 
Chiu Chui-cheng, spokesman of the Mainland Affairs Council, revealed to Nikkei Asia review in 2019 that the ROC Government is planning to block IQIYI and Tencent Video (or WeTV) in Taiwan to curb the false information against Taiwan made by the PRC Government. Chiu added that OTT, IQIYI's Taiwan agent, is under investigation by the ROC's Ministry of Economic Affairs, and could be asked to close its "IQIYI Taiwan Station" if violation of the Act is found.

On 19 August 2020, the Department of Commerce of the Economic Affairs Ministry, citing relevant regulations of the act, banned the operation of mainland Ott platform in Taiwan. IQIYI and Tencent Video were prohibited from operation, or risked a continuous fine of NT$50,000 to $5 million.

See also

 Cross-Strait relations
 Additional Articles of the Constitution of the Republic of China
 1992 Consensus
 One-China policy
 Political status of Taiwan
 Republic of China retreat to Taiwan

References

External links
 Act Governing Relations between Peoples of the Taiwan Area and the Mainland Area

Cross-Strait relations
Law of Taiwan
1992 establishments in Taiwan